Sybarite is the solo project of musician Xian Hawkins, who played with the Silver Apples for a number of years in the 1990s. Sybarite produces abstract midtempo electronica, but also contains elements of jazz and classical music. He has released albums on the 4AD label among others. As of 2015, Sybarite is now featured on the Temporary Residence Ltd. label.

The Sybarite track "Runaway" was featured on the Grey's Anatomy TV series episode "Wishin' and Hopin'".

Discography

Singles and EPs
 Meusic (Emanate, 1999)
 Otonomy (Static Caravan, 2000)
 "Engaged"/"Without Nothing I'm You" (ZEAL, 2001)
 Scene of the Crime (4AD, 2002)

Albums
 Placement Issues (Temporary Residence, 2001)
 Nonument (4AD, 2002)
 Musicforafilm (Temporary Residence, 2004)
 Cut Out Shape (Temporary Residence, 2006)
 Waver The Absolute (Temporary Residence, 2016)

References

External links
Profile for Sybarite on 4AD's website
AllMusic biography

Living people
American electronic musicians
Year of birth missing (living people)
Temporary Residence Limited artists